Frank Cook (21 September 1916 – 10 July 1973) was an  Australian rules footballer who played with South Melbourne in the Victorian Football League (VFL).

Notes

External links 

1916 births
1973 deaths
Australian rules footballers from Victoria (Australia)
Sydney Swans players